Sergei Kudryavtsev may refer to:

 Sergei Viktorovich Kudryavtsev (born 1980), Russian footballer
 Sergei Aleksandrovich Kudryavtsev (1903–1938), Ukrainian communist Soviet politician
 Sergei Mikhailovich Kudryavtsev (1915–1998), Soviet intelligence officer and Soviet Ambassador to Cuba
 Sergey Kudryavtsev (born 1956), Russian film critic and historian